Brad Baker (born August 3, 1974) is an American professional stock car racing driver. He has raced in the NASCAR Nationwide Series, making 52 starts with a best finish of 13th, coming at Nashville Superspeedway in 2001.

Motorsports career results

NASCAR
(key) (Bold – Pole position awarded by qualifying time. Italics – Pole position earned by points standings or practice time. * – Most laps led.)

Nationwide Series

ARCA Re/Max Series
(key) (Bold – Pole position awarded by qualifying time. Italics – Pole position earned by points standings or practice time. * – Most laps led.)

References

External links
 

1974 births
NASCAR drivers
ARCA Menards Series drivers
Living people
People from Franklin, Tennessee
Racing drivers from Tennessee